St Matthew's Church is an Anglican parish church in Willesden in the London Borough of Brent. It is situated on the corner of St Mary's Road and Fawcett Road in Willesden. It was built between 1900 and 1906, designed by W. D. Caröe and is a Grade II listed building. It is in the deanery of Brent, in the archdeaconry of Northolt, in the Diocese of London.

History

Foundation
St Matthew's was founded in 1894 by London Diocesan Home Mission, when it bought a site at the lower end of St Mary's Road. Construction on a temporary iron structure started on 1 December 1894. The church, finished in 1895, could accommodate a congregation of 300 people.

Construction
Work on the permanent church, made out of brick, started on 3 November 1900 when the foundation stone was laid in a dedication ceremony celebrated by the Archdeacon of Middlesex. The church was designed by the architect William Douglas Caröe, and the first portion of the church was consecrated for use on 12 October 1901 by the Bishop of London, Arthur Winnington-Ingram.

The church was completed in sections, with the first part completed in 1901. The vestries and northeast corner were finished on 25 February 1904, the organ was installed on 27 January 1906 and the nave was completed on 11 October 1906 and consecrated two days later. The capacity of the completed church was 878.

Parish hall
The parish hall was built from 17 July 1910 to 6 January 1911. During the First World War it was used as a makeshift hospital and held 40 beds.

It was bombed during the Second World War on 28 September 1940, which claimed the lives of seven people who were sheltering in it. It was derelict until 1951 when it was rebuilt.

Parish
The local school, John Keble Church of England Primary School, has a close relationship with the church. Responsibility for the school is shared between the parish and All Souls' Church in Harlesden.

Services are conducted every week in the church. Every Sunday there is Mass at 11:00 and evensong and benediction at 18:00.

Interior

See also
 Willesden

References

External links
 St Matthew's Church site

Church of England church buildings in the London Borough of Brent
20th-century Church of England church buildings
Grade II listed churches in London
Diocese of London
Willesden
1906 establishments in England
Gothic Revival church buildings in London
Willesden
Grade II listed buildings in the London Borough of Brent
Buildings by W. D. Caröe